Barachak is a railway station in Asansol, Paschim Bardhaman district, West Bengal, India. This is a railway station between Asansol and Sitarampur railway stations.

The railway station
Barachak railway station is located at an elevation of 127 m above sea level.  It has been allotted the railway code – BCQ and is under the jurisdiction of Asansol railway division of Eastern Railway.  It has 3 platforms.

History
The East Indian Railway Company, extended the railway track that had been laid between Kolkata and Hooghly to Raniganj in 1855 and up to Asansol in July 1863. The initial route of the Howrah–Delhi main line was via what is now called the Sahibganj loop. The "shorter main line" was in position in 1871 with the completion of the Raniganj–Kiul section.

Electrification
The Asansol–Sitarampur section, including Barachak-Hirapur Exchange Yard, was electrified in 1960–61.

Mining industry
"The entire belt between Durgapur (158 km from Howrah), and all the way up to Dhanbad and beyond is industrialized. Apart from factories, there are many coalmines, some closed now, and some with fires burning deep in the mineshafts.  The mining area extends for a large area, mostly to the south of the tracks.  Quite a portion of the track passes through cuttings, where the surrounding area is higher than the track level, resulting in the profusion of characteristic small masonry bridges crossing the tracks." This description is from "Gomoh loco shed and CLW trip record" by Samit Roychoudhury.

References

External links
Trains at Barachak

Railway stations in Paschim Bardhaman district
Asansol railway division
Railway stations opened in 1871